Boris Mikhailovich Sichkin (1922–2002) was a Soviet and American film actor, dancer, choreographer, composer and entertainer.

Biography 
Sichkin born in Kyiv in the family of a Jewish shoemaker, who died when he was 4 years old. The elder brother taught Boris dances and performances, according to the memoirs, his first performances took place at the Jewish market in front of some criminals who used to assemble there. After escaping from the house he was expelled from school. In 1937–1941 he studied at the Kyiv Ballet School, and danced in the P. Virsky Ukrainian National Folk Dance Ensemble.

He participated in World War II.

He participated in the work of the theater of Arts, bandleader Eddie Rosner. His most memorable film roles are as coupletist Buba Kastorsky in The Elusive Avengers and its sequel and as Leonid Brezhnev in the American epic historical film Nixon.

In 1973, in Tambov, he was arrested on suspicion of theft of state property in a large scale. A year later was released. The investigation lasted several years. In the end, Boris Sichkin was finally acquitted.

In 1979 he left to the United States. Member of the editorial board of the New York City Russian newspaper “Russian Bazaar”.

Death
He died on March 21, 2002, of a heart attack in his apartment in New York City. Soon, at the request of his wife, Sichkin's remains were recovered from the grave and cremated, and the urn with the ashes moved to Moscow.

Filmography
Goodbye, Boys (1964) as Entertainer
The Elusive Avengers (1966) as Buba Kastorsky
The New Adventures of the Elusive Avengers (1968) as Buba Kastorsky
At War as at War (1968) as Selivanov
Barbara the Fair with the Silken Hair (1969) as Groom-Prestidigitator
The Golden Horns (1972) as Dandellion the Robber
Incorrigible Liar (1973) as Prince of Burukhtania's translator
The Final Days (1989) as Leonid Brezhnev
Nixon (1995) as Leonid Brezhnev
Poor Sasha (1997) as Aristarkh Lvovich Rastopchin
World War III (1998) as General Vladimir Ulyanovich Soshkin
Third Watch (2001) as Uri (Episode "After Time")

References

External links

 Boris Sichkin

1922 births
2002 deaths
20th-century Russian male actors
21st-century Russian male actors
Actors from Kyiv
Russian male comedians
Russian male composers
Russian male dancers
Russian male film actors
Soviet emigrants to the United States
Soviet male composers
Soviet male dancers
Soviet male film actors
Soviet military personnel of World War II
Spoken word artists
Burials at Vagankovo Cemetery